Elections took place in Huron County, Ontario on October 25, 2010 in conjunction with municipal elections across the province.

Huron County Council

Ashfield-Colborne-Wawanosh

Bluewater

Central Huron

Goderich

Howick

Huron East

Morris-Turnberry

North Huron

South Huron

References

2010 Ontario municipal elections
Huron County, Ontario